Vernon ("Vern") John Hanaray (born 14 August 1951 in Masterton) is a former road cyclist from New Zealand, who represented his native country in the men's individual road race at the 1972 and 1976 Summer Olympics. He also competed at the 1974 and 1978 Commonwealth Games. Hanaray won the 1974 edition of the Archer Grand Prix cycle race.

Sport 
Road Skating
1968
  1st Place, Intermediate Men's 5 Miles Road Race
1969
  1st Place, Intermediate Men's 5 Miles Road Race

Road Cycling
1970
  3rd Place, Road Cycling Championship

1971
  1st Place, Road Cycling Championship
  1st Place, Dulux 6 Day Cycle Race
  1st Place, King of the Mountains (Dulux 6 Day)

1972
  Olympic Games Team, Munich

1973
  1st Place, Road Cycling Championship
  1st Place, Dulux 6 Day Cycle Race
  1st Place, King of the Mountains (Dulux 6 Day)

1974
  1st Place, Pernod International Grand Prix
  2nd Place, Manx International Road Race
 

1975
  1st Place, Bornem
  1st Place, Stage 2 Leimuiden International Wieleravond Zesdaage Den Haag

1976
  1st Place, Stage 1 Les Deux Jours D Angreau
  2nd Place, Stage 2 D Angreau
  1st Place, Classement Final, D Angreau
  1st Place, Classement Du Meilleur Grimpeur, D Angreau
  1st Place, Outer 
  1st Place, International Liefhebbers te Oudenaarde-Nederename
  1st Place, Tielt 
  1st Place, Stage 1 Tweedaage Van Kemmel
  2nd Place, Stage 2 Tweedaage Van Kemmel
  1st Place, Einstand, Tweedaage Van Kemmel 
 1st Place, Blackpool Centenary, Milk Race Tour of Britain
  1st Place, Middlemores Combativity, Milk Race Tour of Britain
  Olympic Games, Team Montreal
  1st Place, King of the Mountains (Dulux Six Day)

1977
  3rd Place, Etoile Hennuyere, Classement General
  1st Place, Road Cycling Championship
  3rd Place, Tour de Nouvelle Caledonie Classment General
  1st Place, Classment de la Montage

1979
  2nd Grafton-Inverell Classic
  1st Place, King of the Mountains (Dulux Six Day)

1980
  1st Place, Stage 8 Southport, Milk Race Tour of Britain
  3rd Place, Stage 6 Llandudno
Winner Most Aggressive Rider, Milk Race Tour of Britain
  Selected Olympic Games Team, Moscow 
  3rd Place, De la Quatrieme Etape, Tour D'Auvergne
  1st Place, Classment De La Montagne, Tour D'Auvergne
  1st Place, King of the Mountains (Dulux Six Day)

References

External links
 Vernon's Website - Allyed Property Services - APS
 

1951 births
Living people
New Zealand male cyclists
Cyclists at the 1972 Summer Olympics
Cyclists at the 1976 Summer Olympics
Olympic cyclists of New Zealand
Cyclists at the 1978 Commonwealth Games
Cyclists at the 1974 British Commonwealth Games
Commonwealth Games competitors for New Zealand
Sportspeople from Masterton